Rachel Manley (born 1955) is a Jamaican writer in verse and prose, born in Cornwall, England, raised in Jamaica and currently (as of August 2020) residing in Canada. She is a daughter of the former Jamaican prime minister, Michael Manley. She was briefly married to George Albert Harley de Vere Drummond, father of the film director Matthew Vaughn.

She edited her grandmother Edna Manley's diaries, which were published in 1989. She won the Governor General's Award for English-language non-fiction in 1997 for her memoir Drumblair: Memories of a Jamaican Childhood (1996). She has since published more memoirs and some volumes of verse. Her other biographical works include Horses in Her Hair: A Granddaughter's Story (2008), In My Father's Shade (2004) and Slipstream (2000).

She published her first novel, The Black Peacock, in 2017. The book was a shortlisted finalist for the 2018 Amazon.ca First Novel Award.

Selected bibliography 
 A Light Left On (poetry), 1992
 Drumblair: Memories of a Jamaican Childhood (memoir), 1996
 Slipstream , 2000
 In My Father's Shade, 2004
 Horses in Her Hair: A Granddaughter's Story, 2008
 The Black Peacock (novel), 2017

Footnotes

1955 births
20th-century Canadian non-fiction writers
20th-century Canadian women writers
21st-century Canadian non-fiction writers
21st-century Canadian novelists
21st-century Canadian women writers
British emigrants to Jamaica
Canadian memoirists
Canadian women memoirists
Canadian women novelists
Governor General's Award-winning non-fiction writers
Jamaican emigrants to Canada
Jamaican non-fiction writers
Jamaican women writers
Living people
Rachel